The England men's national squash team represents England in international squash team competitions, and is governed by England Squash.

Since 1981, England has won 5 World Squash Team Open titles. Their most recent title came in 2013.

Current team
 Declan James 
 James Willstrop
 Daryl Selby
 Tom Richards

Results

World Team Squash Championships

European Squash Team Championships

See also 
 Squash in England
 England Squash
 World Team Squash Championships
 England women's national squash team

References

External links 
 Team England

Squash teams
Men's national squash teams

Squash in England
Squash